American Radio Relay League, Inc. v. FCC can refer to:

 American Radio Relay League, Inc. v. FCC (1980), regarding CB radio
 American Radio Relay League, Inc. v. FCC (2008), regarding Broadband over Power Line (BPL)

American Radio Relay League
Federal Communications Commission litigation
Communications authorities
Amateur radio